Connie Oustainge (married name Connie Miles), was a female English international table tennis player.

She captained the England team and competed in the 1938 World Table Tennis Championships and was women's doubles quarter-finalist with Vera Dace.

See also
 List of table tennis players
 List of World Table Tennis Championships medalists

References

English female table tennis players
1917 births
2013 deaths
People from Wembley
People from Felpham